The Gap is a 2013 nonfiction book by Thomas Suddendorf that discusses what cognitive qualities separate humans from other animals, and how they evolved.

The Gap: The Science of What Separates Us From Other Animals. Basic Books: New York

Reviews 
 Anil Ananthaswamy (27 January 2014). What separates us from other animals? New Scientist Retrieved October 5, 2014, from https://www.newscientist.com/article/mg22129531.100-what-separates-us-from-other-animals.html
 Robyn Williams (March 2014). The science of what separates us from other animals. Australian Book Review. Retrieved on October 5, 2014, from http://www.australianbookreview.com.au/abr-online/current-issue/113-march-2014-no-359/1859-the-gap
 Joseph Maldonado (2013). The Gap: The Science of What Separates Us from Other Animals. Psych Central. Retrieved on October 5, 2014, from http://psychcentral.com/lib/the-gap-the-science-of-what-separates-us-from-other-animals/00018372
 Steven Mithen (3 April 2013). Most of Us Are Part Neanderthal. The New York Review of Books. Retrieved on October 5, 2014, from http://www.nybooks.com/articles/archives/2014/apr/03/most-us-are-part-neanderthal/?page=2
 Wray Herbert (10 February 2014). Social Animals - Pondering the limits of anthropomorphism. The Weekly Standard Vol. 19, No. 21. Retrieved on October 5, 2014, from http://www.weeklystandard.com/articles/social-animals_775990.html
 David Barash (15 November 2013). Book Review: 'The Gap' by Thomas Suddendorf - What makes humans unique—tools? Language? Cooking?. The Wall Street Journal. Retrieved on October 5, 2014, from https://www.wsj.com/articles/SB10001424052702304527504579169670682265630
 Nina Bai (17 October 2013). MIND Reviews: The Gap. Scientific American Mind volume 24 issue 5. Retrieved on October 5, 2014, from http://www.scientificamerican.com/article/mind-reviews-the-gap/
 Eric Michael Johnson (20 March 2014). The Gap: The Science of What Separates Us From Other Animals, by Thomas Suddendorf. The Times Higher Education. Retrieved on October 5, 2014, from http://www.timeshighereducation.co.uk/books/the-gap-the-science-of-what-separates-us-from-other-animals-by-thomas-suddendorf/2012081.article
 Staff writer (26 August 2013). The Gap: The Science of What Separates Us from Other Animals. Publishers Weekly. Retrieved on October 5, 2014, from http://www.publishersweekly.com/978-0-465-03014-9
 Tim Radford (7 November 2013). Human evolution: Us and them. Nature. Retrieved on October 5, 2014, from http://www.nature.com/nature/journal/v503/n7474/full/503034a.html
 Bryan Sim (16 May 2014). How great a separation? Science. Retrieved on October 5, 2014, from https://www.science.org/doi/full/10.1126/science.1254362
 Staff writer (12 November 2013). The Gap - The Science of What Separates Us From Other Animals. Kirkus Reviews Retrieved October 5, 2014, from http://www.kirkusreviews.com/book-reviews/thomas-suddendorf/the-gap/
 Rob Brooks (3 June 2014). What makes us human? The Conversation. Retrieved on October 6, 2014, from http://theconversation.com/what-makes-us-human-24764

External links 
 Author's book page
 Publisher's book page

Popular science books
2013 non-fiction books
American non-fiction books
Neuroscience books
Human evolution books
Ethology
Animals and humans
Basic Books books